The following are the appointments to various Canadian Honours of 2015. Usually, they are announced as part of the New Year and Canada Day celebrations and are published within the Canada Gazette during year. This follows the custom set out within the United Kingdom which publishes its appoints of various British Honours for New Year's and for monarch's official birthday. However, instead of the midyear appointments announced on Victoria Day, the official birthday of the Canadian Monarch, this custom has been transferred with the celebration of Canadian Confederation and the creation of the Order of Canada.

However, as the Canada Gazette publishes appointment to various orders, decorations and medal, either Canadian or from Commonwealth and foreign states, this article will reference all Canadians so honoured during the 2015 calendar year.

Provincial Honours are not listed within the Canada Gazette, however they are listed within the various publications of each provincial government. Provincial honours are listed within the page.

The Order of Canada

Companions of the Order of Canada

 James Douglas Fleck, C.C.
 Donald Malcolm McRae, C.C.
 Richard W. Pound, C.C., O.Q. - This is a promotion within the Order
 The Honourable Robert Keith Rae, P.C., C.C., O.Ont. - This is a promotion within the Order
 Janet Rossant, C.C.

Officer of the Order of Canada

 Albert Bandura, O.C.
 The Honourable Jean-Louis Baudouin, O.C., G.O.Q.
 Mark Carney, O.C.
 Catherine Frazee, O.C.
 Shaf Keshavjee, O.C., O.Ont.
 Mark Lautens, O.C.
 Wendy Levinson, O.C.
 Norman Emilio Marcon, O.C.
 James Rodger Miller, O.C., S.O.M.
 The Honourable Peter Milliken, P.C., O.C.
 Julio Montaner, O.C., O.B.C.
 Nancy Margaret Reid, O.C.
 Eleanor Wachtel, O.C. - This is a promotion within the Order
 Sandra Black, O.C., O.Ont.
 Stephen Cook, O.C., O.Ont.
 Kenneth Denton Craig, O.C.
 Daniel J. Drucker, O.C.
 Mary Gospodarowicz Evans, O.C.
 Paul D. N. Hebert, O.C.
 The Honourable Allen Linden, O.C.
 Linda F. Nazar, O.C.
 The Honourable Louise Otis, O.C., O.Q.
 James Thomas Rutka, O.C., O.Ont.
 Stephen Toope, O.C.

Members of the Order of Canada

 Caroline Andrew, C.M.
 Jean-Pierre Andrieux, C.M.
 The Honourable Jacob Austin, P.C., C.M., O.B.C.
 Baidar Bakht, C.M.
 Denis Brott, C.M.
 Lisa Brown, C.M., M.S.M.
 Wally Buono, C.M.
 Peter Calamai, C.M.
 Christina Stuart Cameron, C.M.
 Wendy Marion Cecil, C.M.
 Brenda Clark, C.M.
 Robert Cecil Cole, C.M.
 Tim Cook, C.M.
 George Cope, C.M.
 Robert W. Cox, C.M.
 Alexander Gordon Craig, C.M.
 John W. Crichton, C.M.
 Conrad Charles Daellenbach, C.M.
 Patrick Dolan Darrah, C.M., O.N.B.
 Michael DeGagné, C.M., O.Ont.
 Jean-Guy Desjardins, C.M.
 Alba DiCenso, C.M.
 Edgar J. Dosman, C.M.
 Joanne M. Sullivan Douglas, C.M.
 Barry V. Downs, C.M.
 Louise Dupré, C.M.
 Simon Durivage, C.M.
 Kappy Flanders, C.M., M.S.M.
 Charles Foran, C.M.
 Julia E. Foster, C.M.
 Raymonde Gagné, C.M., O.M.
 Brenda Louise Gallie, C.M., O.Ont.
 Serge Gauthier, C.M.
 The Honourable Aurélien Gill, C.M., C.Q.
 James K. Gordon, C.M.
 The Honourable William C. Graham, P.C., C.M.
 John Grew, C.M.
 Christophe Guy, C.M., O.Q.
 Thomas Jon Harle, C.M., C.D.
 Frank Hasenfratz, C.M.
 Adèle M. Hurley, C.M.
 Joan F. Ivory, C.M.
 Patrick Johnston, C.M.
 John G. Kelton, C.M.
 Sheldon Kennedy, C.M.
 Laurence Klotz, C.M.
 Chantal Kreviazuk, C.M.
 Normand Laprise, C.M., C.Q.
 John Barker Lawson, C.M.
 Suzie LeBlanc, C.M.
 Grégoire Legendre, C.M.
 Jens Horst Lindemann, C.M.
 Keith MacLellan, C.M.
 Michael I. M. MacMillan, C.M.
 Raine Maida, C.M.
 Thomas J. Marrie, C.M.
 John G. McAvity, C.M.
 Susan McGrath, C.M.
 Jeremy Nichol McNeil, C.M.
 The Honourable Michael A. Meighen, C.M.
 Robert Mellin, C.M.
 Diane Morin, C.M.
 Russell J. Morrison, C.M.
 Peter Ernest Murdoch, C.M.
 Dan Needles, C.M.
 Cal Nichols, C.M.
 John Palmer, C.M.
 Charles E. Pascal, C.M.
 Michael Phillips, C.M.
 Ervin Podgorsak, C.M.
 John R. Porter, C.M., C.Q.
 Gary Slaight, C.M.
 H. Olav Slaymaker, C.M.
 Robyn Tamblyn, C.M.
 Jean-Claude Tardif, C.M.
 Lorraine Vaillancourt, C.M.
 Eric Robert Walters, C.M.
 H. Bruce Williams, C.M.
 Catherine Zahn, C.M.
 Ida Albo, C.M.
 Aubie Angel, C.M.
 Kenneth MacClure Baird, C.M.
 Pierre Bergeron, C.M.
 Daniel Bertolino, C.M.
 William A. Black, C.M.
 Nathalie Bondil, C.M., C.Q.
 Josiane Boulad-Ayoub, C.M.
 Beverley Boys, C.M.
 Blake Brooker, C.M.
 Bruce D. Campbell, C.M.
 Pat Capponi, C.M., O.Ont.
 Serge Chapleau, C.M.
 Martin Chernin, C.M.
 Wayne Suk Wing Chiu, C.M.
 John V. Cross, C.M., S.O.M.
 Jagannath Prasad Das, C.M.
 Lisa de Wilde, C.M.
 James F. Dinning, C.M.
 Madeleine Dion Stout, C.M.
 Elaine Dobbin, C.M.
 The Honourable Joyce Fairbairn, C.M.
 Michèle Fortin, C.M.
 Margaret Fountain, C.M.
 Douglas Edgar Fregin, C.M.
 Linda Gaboriau, C.M.
 David Roy Gillespie, C.M.
 Graham Greene, C.M.
 Yolande Grisé, C.M.
 Kathryn Jane Nightingale Hannah, C.M.
 Carolyn Hansson, C.M.
 Stewart Harris, C.M.
 Bill Henderson, C.M.
 Paul James Hill, C.M.
 Lawrence Hill, C.M.
 Leah Hollins, C.M.
 Mel Hoppenheim, C.M.
 Russ Howard, C.M., O.N.L.
 Sandra Irving, C.M.
 Jacques Israelievitch, C.M.
 Major Tetsuo Theodore Itani, C.M., O.M.M., C.D. (Ret'd)
 Monique Jérôme-Forget, C.M., O.Q.
 Donna Soble Kaufman, C.M.
 Frances Oldham Kelsey, C.M.
 Jay Keystone, C.M.
 Douglas Knight, C.M.
 Julia Koschitzky, C.M.
 Arthur Alexander Kube, C.M.
 Ginette Laurin, C.M.
 Ophelia Lazaridis, C.M.
 Marie-Nicole Lemieux, C.M., C.Q.
 Adeera Levin, C.M.
 H. Susan Lewis, C.M., O.M.
 J. Mark Lievonen, C.M.
 Judy Loman, C.M.
 Michel Louvain, C.M., C.Q.
 Christine Magee, C.M.
 Lynn McDonald, C.M.
 Jack Mintz, C.M.
 The Honourable John Wilson Morden, C.M.
 Fiona Nelson, C.M.
 Frank Newfeld, C.M.
 Anthony Phillips, C.M.
 Vivian Morris Rakoff, C.M.
 Mohamed Iqbal Ravalia, C.M.
 Garry L. Rempel, C.M.
 John Carman Ricker, C.M.
 Fran Rider, C.M.
 Lawrence Rossy, C.M., O.Q.
 Mary Rozsa de Coquet, C.M.
 Hubert Sacy, C.M., C.Q.
 Sandra Scarth, C.M.
 Bonnie Schmidt, C.M.
 Barbara Kristina Schmidt, C.M.
 François Schubert, C.M.
 Marla Shapiro, C.M.
 Susan Sherwin, C.M.
 E. Leigh Syms, C.M.
 Don Tapscott, C.M.
 Serge Patrice Thibodeau, C.M.
 Morley Torgov, C.M.
 Barbara Turnbull, C.M.
 V. Prem Watsa, C.M.
 Carolyn Ruth Wilson, C.M.
 Martin Yaffe, C.M.
 Phyllis Yaffe, C.M.

Order of Military Merit

Termination of an appointment within the Order of Military Merit
 Lieutenant-Colonel Deborah Miller, C.D.

Commanders of the Order of Military Merit

 Lieutenant-General Michael Day, C.M.M., M.S.C., C.D. - This is a promotion within the Order
 Rear-Admiral Joseph Edward Thomas Peter Ellis, C.M.M., C.D.
 Rear-Admiral Patrick Terence Finn, C.M.M., C.D. - This is a promotion within the Order
 Major-General Dean James Milner, C.M.M., M.S.C., C.D. - This is a promotion within the Order
 Major-General Pierre St-Amand, C.M.M., C.D. - This is a promotion within the Order

Officers of the Order of Military Merit

 Lieutenant-Colonel Eleonora Maria Agnew, O.M.M., C.D.
 Lieutenant-Colonel Joseph Michel Steve Boivin, O.M.M., M.S.M., C.D.
 Captain(N) Luc Cassivi, O.M.M., C.D.
 Colonel Grant Fernand Dame, O.M.M., M.S.M., C.D.
 Colonel Joseph Serge Steve Dany Fortin, O.M.M., C.D.
 Colonel Blaise Francis Frawley, O.M.M., C.D.
 Major Michael Hans Groh, O.M.M., C.D.
 Lieutenant-Colonel Steven Leslie Hart, O.M.M., C.D.
 Colonel Kerry William Horlock, O.M.M., M.S.M., C.D.
 Lieutenant-Colonel Mark Bradley Larsen, O.M.M., C.D.
 Major Rickey Maxwell Lewis, O.M.M., C.D.
 Colonel Hugh Colin Mackay, O.M.M., C.D.
 Brigadier-General Rob Roy Everett MacKenzie, O.M.M., C.D.
 Colonel Russell Barry Mann, O.M.M., C.D.
 Lieutenant-Colonel James Andrew Peck, O.M.M., C.D.
 Commander Patricia Lee Roberts, O.M.M., C.D.
 Colonel Joseph Albert Donald Rousseau, O.M.M., C.D.
 Colonel Marie Céline Danielle Savard, O.M.M., M.S.M., C.D.
 Commander Sandra Maria Sukstorf, O.M.M., C.D.
 Captain(N) Stephen Alexander Virgin, O.M.M., M.S.M., C.D.
 Colonel David Ross Weger, O.M.M., C.D.
 Colonel Terrence Leroy Wood, O.M.M., C.D.

Members of the Order of Military Merit

 Captain Timothy David Aldridge, M.M.M., C.D.
 Master Warrant Officer Donald Earl Askeland, M.M.M., C.D.
 Sergeant Nicole Lynn Barrett, M.M.M., C.D.
 Warrant Officer Dana Beverly Beattie, M.M.M., C.D.
 Master Warrant Officer Ian Ronald Jude Bennett, M.M.M., C.D.
 Chief Petty Officer 2nd Class Brent Garrett Bethell, M.M.M., C.D.
 Warrant Officer David Carman Bibby, M.M.M., C.D.
 Chief Petty Officer 1st Class Joseph Fernand Sylvain Bolduc, M.M.M., C.D.
 Chief Warrant Officer Joseph Lauredan Daniel Brissette, M.M.M., M.S.M., C.D.
 Master Warrant Officer Daniel Andrew Campbell, M.M.M., C.D.
 Warrant Officer Steve Martin Caron, M.M.M., C.D.
 Chief Petty Officer 2nd Class Marie-Josée Chapleau, M.M.M., C.D.
 Chief Warrant Officer Joseph Charles Philippe Chevalier, M.M.M., C.D.
 Master Warrant Officer John Castel Copeland, M.M.M., C.D.
 Sergeant Steven Dunley Dacey, M.M.M., C.D.
 Chief Warrant Officer Claude Dallaire, M.M.M., M.S.M., C.D.
 Master Warrant Officer Marnie Davis, M.M.M., C.D.
 Warrant Officer Stephen Michael Dawe, M.M.M., C.D.
 Master Warrant Officer Joseph Gilbert Alain Denis Delisle, M.M.M., C.D.
 Warrant Officer Brenda Lee Di Bartolo, M.M.M., C.D.
 Master Warrant Officer Paul André Christian Doucet, M.M.M., C.D.
 Master Warrant Officer Joseph Georges André Dugal, M.M.M., C.D.
 Sub-Lieutenant Michèle Dumaresq-Ouellet, M.M.M., M.S.M., C.D.
 Warrant Officer Richard Fancy, M.M.M., C.D.
 Chief Petty Officer 1st Class Paul Andrew Fenton, M.M.M., C.D.
 Sergeant Timothy Ferguson, M.M.M., C.D.
 Major Erica Leigh Fleck, M.M.M., C.D.
 Master Warrant Officer Joseph Lucien Steve Fréchette, M.M.M., C.D.
 Chief Warrant Officer Joseph Gérard Marc Gabanna, M.M.M., C.D.
 Master Warrant Officer Clermont Gagné, M.M.M., C.D.
 Major Stephen Foster Gallagher, M.M.M., C.D.
 Major George Charles Garrard, M.M.M., C.D.
 Chief Warrant Officer Joseph Dominic Stéphane Gaudreau, M.M.M., C.D.
 Master Warrant Officer Joseph Claude Dominique Geoffroy, M.M.M., C.D.
 Chief Warrant Officer Joseph Gerard René Gilbert, M.M.M., C.D.
 Chief Warrant Officer Joseph Guy Bruno Claude Gilbert, M.M.M., C.D.
 Sergeant Rachel Girard, M.M.M., C.D.
 Chief Warrant Officer Joseph Alexander Marcel Stephan Goupil, M.M.M., C.D.
 Major Douglas Shawn Patrick Groves, M.M.M., C.D.
 Captain Marie Janick Nancy Guérin, M.M.M., C.D.
 Master Warrant Officer William John Hall, M.M.M., C.D.
 Chief Warrant Officer Colleen Ann Halpin, M.M.M., C.D.
 Master Warrant Officer Crystal Lynn Harris, M.M.M., C.D.
 Chief Warrant Officer Mitchell Hepburn, M.M.M., C.D.
 Master Warrant Officer David Edward Hepditch, M.M.M., C.D.
 Warrant Officer Daniel James Holley, M.M.M., C.D.
 Warrant Officer Marie Doris Diane Jalbert, M.M.M., C.D.
 Chief Petty Officer 2nd Class Cyrus Jawahar John, M.M.M., C.D.
 Chief Petty Officer 1st Class Ian Mark Kelly, M.M.M., C.D.
 Captain Joseph Ghislain Lévesque, M.M.M., C.D.
 Chief Warrant Officer Joseph Robert Guy Stéphane Marcoux, M.M.M., C.D.
 Chief Warrant Officer James Gordon Scott Marshall, M.M.M., C.D.
 Captain Malcolm Alastair McMurachy, M.M.M., C.D.
 Master Warrant Officer John Robert McNabb, M.M.M., M.S.C. C.D.
 Chief Petty Officer 2nd Class Richard John Meredith, M.M.M., C.D.
 Master Warrant Officer David Elwell Milligan, M.M.M., M.S.M., C.D.
 Chief Warrant Officer Richard Philias Roger Nadeau, M.M.M., C.D.
 Private Thomas Nickel, M.M.M., C.D.
 Lieutenant(N) Heather Marlene Oake, M.M.M., C.D.
 Master Warrant Officer Joseph Gilles Alain Oligny, M.M.M., C.D.
 Chief Warrant Officer Ambrose Penton, M.M.M., M.S.M., C.D.
 Chief Petty Officer 2nd Class Danny Peppar, M.M.M., C.D.
 Captain Michael Grayer Perkins, M.M.M., C.D.
 Warrant Officer Steven Hugh Edward Price, M.M.M., C.D.
 Chief Warrant Officer Joseph André Michel Provencher, M.M.M., C.D.
 Warrant Officer Kimberly Christine Pyke, M.M.M., C.D.
 Chief Warrant Officer Eric John Rolfe, M.M.M., M.S.M., C.D.
 Warrant Officer Scott Vernon Russell, M.M.M., C.D.
 Warrant Officer Steven Wade Rutt, M.M.M., C.D.
 Chief Warrant Officer Joseph Steeve Yancy Savard, M.M.M., C.D.
 Warrant Officer Lawrence Jeffrey Schnurr, M.M.M., C.D.
 Master Warrant Officer David George Shultz, M.M.M., S.M.V., C.D.
 Petty Officer 1st Class Philip Wade Smith, M.M.M., C.D.
 Chief Petty Officer 2nd Class Eric Wilfred Stone, M.M.M., C.D.
 Warrant Officer Michael David Swinimer, M.M.M., C.D.
 Warrant Officer Jason Tomlinson, M.M.M., C.D.
 Chief Warrant Officer Robert Richard Viel, M.M.M., C.D.
 Petty Officer 2nd Class Tara Lee White, M.M.M., C.D.
 Chief Warrant Officer Martin Woods, M.M.M., C.D.
 Major Darcy James Wright, M.M.M., C.D.
 Chief Petty Officer 2nd Class Kelly Allan Yerama, M.M.M., C.D.

Order of Merit of the Police Forces

Commander of the Order of Merit of the Police Forces

 Chief Constable James Chu, C.O.M. - This is a promotion within the Order

Officers of the Order of Merit of the Police Forces

 Deputy Chief Roger Dean Chaffin, O.O.M.
 Chief Glenn De Caire, O.O.M. - This is a promotion within the Order
 Deputy Chief Michael Federico, O.O.M. - This is a promotion within the Order
 Assistant Commissioner Tracy L. Hardy, O.O.M.
 Chief Douglas Eric Jolliffe, O.O.M. - This is a promotion within the Order
 Assistant Commissioner James Malizia, O.O.M.
 Deputy Chief Mark Saunders, O.O.M.
 Deputy Chief Peter J. M. Sloly, O.O.M. - This is a promotion within the Order

Members of the Order of Merit of the Police Forces

 Sergeant Dean Aitken, M.O.M.
 Sergeant Dean Aitken, M.O.M.
 Superintendent David Benton Attfield, M.O.M.
 Sergeant Robert Bernier, M.O.M.
 Chief Superintendent Fred Bertucca, M.O.M.
 Staff Sergeant Galib Bhayani, M.O.M.
 Inspector Carole Bird, M.O.M.
 Director Serge Boulerice, M.O.M.
 Chief Richard M. Bourassa, M.O.M.
 Staff Sergeant Jacques Brassard, M.O.M.
 Assistant Commissioner Brenda Butterworth-Carr, M.O.M.
 Superintendent Donald A. Campbell, M.O.M.
 Superintendent Claude Castonguay, M.O.M.
 Chief Superintendent F. G. Peter Clark, M.O.M.
 Chief Superintendent Gaétan Courchesne, M.O.M.
 Chief Superintendent Charles E. Cox, M.O.M.
 Chief Dale Cox, M.O.M.
 Superintendent Joanne Grace Crampton, M.O.M.
 Superintendent Leonard Rodney Gelindo Del Pino, M.O.M.
 Director Helen M. R. H. Dion, M.O.M.
 Superintendent Brendan R. Fitzpatrick, M.O.M.
 Chief Albert T. Frederick, M.O.M.
 Chief Superintendent Wayne Gerard Gallant, M.O.M.
 Staff Sergeant Darrell R. Gaudet, M.O.M.
 Detective Inspector Christine A. Gilpin, M.O.M.
 Superintendent R. Graham Gleason, M.O.M.
 Staff Sergeant John W. Goodman, M.O.M.
 Staff Sergeant Isobel Granger, M.O.M.
 Chief Ian Robert Grant, M.O.M.
 Constable Arnold F. Guerin, M.O.M.
 Deputy Chief Anthony John Harder, M.O.M.
 Superintendent Peter W. G. M. Haring, M.O.M.
 Sergeant Philip H. Hasenpflug, M.O.M.
 Staff Sergeant Lindsay E. Hernden, M.O.M.
 Sergeant Stephen F. Hicks, M.O.M.
 Mr. Gary A. Holden, M.O.M.
 Deputy Chief Constable Steven Herbert Ing, M.O.M.
 Chief Inspector Daniel Jacques, M.O.M.
 Chief Darrell L. Kambeitz, M.O.M.
 Detective Inspector Andrew Michael Karski, M.O.M.
 Staff Sergeant Matthew Kavanagh, M.O.M.
 Assistant Commissioner Louise Lafrance, M.O.M.
 Captain Dominique Lafrenière, M.O.M.
 Superintendent Serge Lalonde, M.O.M.
 Chief Inspector Panagiotis Lambrinakos, M.O.M.
 Chief John Leontowicz, M.O.M.
 Deputy Chief Joseph James Matthews, M.O.M.
 Deputy Chief Christopher McCord, M.O.M.
 Constable Michael McCormack, M.O.M.
 Superintendent Kenneth Dwayne McDonald, M.O.M.
 Superintendent Robin McElary-Downer, M.O.M.
 Inspector Dennis McGuffin, M.O.M.
 Deputy Chief Antje B. McNeely, M.O.M.
 Assistant Commissioner Gilles Joseph Robert Moreau, M.O.M.
 Staff Sergeant Paul Allan Mulvihill, M.O.M.
 Inspector Robert Joseph Page, M.O.M.
 Deputy Chief John B. Pare, M.O.M.
 Chief Paul E. Pedersen, M.O.M.
 Assistant Commissioner Pierre Perron, M.O.M.
 Chief Superintendent Guy J. Pilon, M.O.M.
 Inspector Christopher Renwick, M.O.M.
 Deputy Chief J. Daniel Rioux, M.O.M.
 Staff Sergeant Michael S. Savage, M.O.M.
 Sergeant David Marc Searle, M.O.M.
 Inspector Roderick Kenneth Shaw, M.O.M.
 Assistant Commissioner Todd Shean, M.O.M.
 Assistant Commissioner Dale Sheehan, M.O.M.
 Ms. Verona Singer, M.O.M.
 Sergeant Craig Marshall Smith, M.O.M.
 Chief Superintendent Marlene Rose Snowman, M.O.M.
 Sergeant Jeff Robert Swann, M.O.M.
 Assistant Commissioner Marc Tardif, M.O.M.
 Detective Superintendent David D. J. Truax, M.O.M.
 Patrol Sergeant Edith H. Turner, M.O.M.
 Staff Sergeant James L. Vardy, M.O.M.
 Assistant Commissioner Stephen Edward White, M.O.M.
 Superintendent Daryl Wiebe, M.O.M.
 Inspector Catherine Ann Yeandle-Slater, M.O.M.
 Superintendent Andris Zarins, M.O.M.Superintendent David Benton Attfield, M.O.M.
 Sergeant Robert Bernier, M.O.M.
 Chief Superintendent Fred Bertucca, M.O.M.
 Staff Sergeant Galib Bhayani, M.O.M.
 Inspector Carole Bird, M.O.M.
 Director Serge Boulerice, M.O.M.
 Chief Richard M. Bourassa, M.O.M.
 Staff Sergeant Jacques Brassard, M.O.M.
 Assistant Commissioner Brenda Butterworth-Carr, M.O.M.
 Superintendent Donald A. Campbell, M.O.M.
 Superintendent Claude Castonguay, M.O.M.
 Chief Superintendent F. G. Peter Clark, M.O.M.
 Chief Superintendent Gaétan Courchesne, M.O.M.
 Chief Superintendent Charles E. Cox, M.O.M.
 Chief Dale Cox, M.O.M.
 Superintendent Joanne Grace Crampton, M.O.M.
 Superintendent Leonard Rodney Gelindo Del Pino, M.O.M.
 Director Helen M. R. H. Dion, M.O.M.
 Superintendent Brendan R. Fitzpatrick, M.O.M.
 Chief Albert T. Frederick, M.O.M.
 Chief Superintendent Wayne Gerard Gallant, M.O.M.
 Staff Sergeant Darrell R. Gaudet, M.O.M.
 Detective Inspector Christine A. Gilpin, M.O.M.
 Superintendent R. Graham Gleason, M.O.M.
 Staff Sergeant John W. Goodman, M.O.M.
 Staff Sergeant Isobel Granger, M.O.M.
 Chief Ian Robert Grant, M.O.M.
 Constable Arnold F. Guerin, M.O.M.
 Deputy Chief Anthony John Harder, M.O.M.
 Superintendent Peter W. G. M. Haring, M.O.M.
 Sergeant Philip H. Hasenpflug, M.O.M.
 Staff Sergeant Lindsay E. Hernden, M.O.M.
 Sergeant Stephen F. Hicks, M.O.M.
 Mr. Gary A. Holden, M.O.M.
 Deputy Chief Constable Steven Herbert Ing, M.O.M.
 Chief Inspector Daniel Jacques, M.O.M.
 Chief Darrell L. Kambeitz, M.O.M.
 Detective Inspector Andrew Michael Karski, M.O.M.
 Staff Sergeant Matthew Kavanagh, M.O.M.
 Assistant Commissioner Louise Lafrance, M.O.M.
 Captain Dominique Lafrenière, M.O.M.
 Superintendent Serge Lalonde, M.O.M.
 Chief Inspector Panagiotis Lambrinakos, M.O.M.
 Chief John Leontowicz, M.O.M.
 Deputy Chief Joseph James Matthews, M.O.M.
 Deputy Chief Christopher McCord, M.O.M.
 Constable Michael McCormack, M.O.M.
 Superintendent Kenneth Dwayne McDonald, M.O.M.
 Superintendent Robin McElary-Downer, M.O.M.
 Inspector Dennis McGuffin, M.O.M.
 Deputy Chief Antje B. McNeely, M.O.M.
 Assistant Commissioner Gilles Joseph Robert Moreau, M.O.M.
 Staff Sergeant Paul Allan Mulvihill, M.O.M.
 Inspector Robert Joseph Page, M.O.M.
 Deputy Chief John B. Pare, M.O.M.
 Chief Paul E. Pedersen, M.O.M.
 Assistant Commissioner Pierre Perron, M.O.M.
 Chief Superintendent Guy J. Pilon, M.O.M.
 Inspector Christopher Renwick, M.O.M.
 Deputy Chief J. Daniel Rioux, M.O.M.
 Staff Sergeant Michael S. Savage, M.O.M.
 Sergeant David Marc Searle, M.O.M.
 Inspector Roderick Kenneth Shaw, M.O.M.
 Assistant Commissioner Todd Shean, M.O.M.
 Assistant Commissioner Dale Sheehan, M.O.M.
 Ms. Verona Singer, M.O.M.
 Sergeant Craig Marshall Smith, M.O.M.
 Chief Superintendent Marlene Rose Snowman, M.O.M.
 Sergeant Jeff Robert Swann, M.O.M.
 Assistant Commissioner Marc Tardif, M.O.M.
 Detective Superintendent David D. J. Truax, M.O.M.
 Patrol Sergeant Edith H. Turner, M.O.M.
 Staff Sergeant James L. Vardy, M.O.M.
 Assistant Commissioner Stephen Edward White, M.O.M.
 Superintendent Daryl Wiebe, M.O.M.
 Inspector Catherine Ann Yeandle-Slater, M.O.M.
 Superintendent Andris Zarins, M.O.M.

Royal Victorian Order

Commander of the Royal Victorian Order
 The Honourable Hilary M. Weston, C.M., O.Ont.

Member of the Royal Victorian Order
 Craig Lennard Kowalik

Most Venerable Order of the Hospital of St. John of Jerusalem

Knights and Dames of the Order of St. John
 John Wesley Cosman, NB
 Her Honour the Honourable Elizabeth Dowdeswell, O.C., O.Ont., ON
 André Levesque, O.M.M., C.D., PE
 Kenneth Ross Turriff, ON

Commanders of the Order of St. John
 Brian Allan Kinaschuk, ON
 Major Victor Knowlton, C.D., QC
 Alan McBride, ON
 Carolyn Frances Rothenburger (née Trost), SK
 Captain Samuel Wenzel Billich, C.D., ON 
 Leslie Helen Jack, ON
 Brigadier-General (Retired) Stanley Gordon Johnstone, C.D., ON
 Alain Louis Joseph Laurencelle, MB
 Donald Sherwood, NB

Officers of the Order of St. John
 David Clifton Bean, NB
 Taramay Curtis, AB
 Armand Paul La Barge, ON
 Jean-Philippe Lebel, QC
 Gerald William McEwin, ON
 Ian Hugh Miller, ON
 James Douglas Tooke, ON
 Donald Raymond Wilson, NB
 Captain Peter Beatty, C.D., ON
 Warrant Officer Andrew Shawn Daring, AB
 Susan Beth Davis, NL
 Stéphane Gignac, QC
 Larry James Jeider, BC 
 Travis Ryan Lanoway, AB
 Angeline Pleunis, ON

Members of the Order of St. John
 Lieutenant-Colonel Richard Frank Bialachowski, C.D., ON 
 Joanne Margaret Biggs, ON
 Officer Cadet Jason Bond, NS
 Steven Bradley, NS
 Captain Stephen Brosha, NS
 Lisa Danielle Burke, NS
 William Thomas Cahill, NL
 Joel Campbell, ON
 Lieutenant-Colonel Frances Louise Chilton-Mackay, O.M.M., M.S.M., C.D., ON
 Dirk Alexander Chisholm, AB
 Philip Peter Dawson, ON
 James Donohue, NS
 Thomas Barry Kevin Ferguson, C.D., ON
 Manon Gauthier, QC
 Major (Retired) Paul Henry, C.D., ON
 Jean Claude Latour, NS
 Master Corporal Richard Herve Joseph Le Coz, ON
 Tamara Lynne MacDuff, NS
 Daniel Charles Maher, NL 
 Carney De Berri Matheson, ON
 Lieutenant-Colonel (Retired) Michael David McKay, C.D., ON
 Pedrom Nasiri, AB
 Gerrard Austin Nudds, ON
 Jason Nurse, ON 
 Nancy Elizabeth Page, ON
 Major Michael Andrew Rehill, C.D., ON 
 Gail Colleen Rogers, ON
 Beverly Segal, ON
 Dean William Smith, AB
 Gerry Stamp, NL
 Jeannette Tinsley, ON
 Ahmad Sulaiman Aini, MB
 Major Harvey Roy Bailey, C.D., ON 
 Ally Wai Ying Chan Chin, BC 
 Deborah Cooke, ON
 Major Patrick Thomas Crocco, ON
 Catherine Mary Crowther, BC
 Joy Dockrey, BC
 Jonathan Mathew Craig Farrell-Griffin, ON
 Glenda Mary Janes, NL
 Rebecca Anne Johnston, ON
 Christopher Kirec, ON
 Winnie Wing-May Lai, BC
 Jeffrey Lavigne, ON
 John Mario Norbert Lemieux, QC 
 Jessica Elizabeth Lezen, MB
 Harold Joseph MacKinnon, ON
 Sanny Sum Yee Marr, BC
 Angela Corinne Martin, NL
 Lieutenant-Colonel Raymond Charles McGill, ON 
 Kevin Moore, SK
 Kathy Ross, QC
 Captain Jean-Pascal Roy, C.D., QC
 Glen William Rutland, NT
 Lynn Ann Telo, ON
 Lieutenant-Commander (Retired) John Frederick Trigg, BC 
 Raymond David Valentine, C.D., BC
 Kristen Johanna Brearley Van Esch, BC
 Karen Frances Walker, ON
 Martin William Wong, BC
 Yu Hin Jackson Wu, BC 
 Wilson King Kai Yeung, BC

Provincial Honours

National Order of Québec

Grand Officers of the National Order of Québec

 Denys Arcand, G.O.Q
 Michel Tremblay, G.O.Q

Honorary Grand Officer
 François Hollande, G.O.Q

Officers of the National Order of Québec

 Marcel Barbeau, O.Q
 Jean Bissonnette, O.Q
 François-Marc Gagnon, O.Q
 Madeleine Gagnon, O.Q
 Lise Gauvin, O.Q
 Paul Inchauspé, O.Q
 Joanne Liu, O.Q
 Pierre A. Michaud, O.Q
 Yannick Nézet-Séguin, O.Q
 Jean Rochon, O.Q
 Jean-Louis Roy, O.Q
 Céline Saint-Pierre, O.Q
 Réjean Thomas, O.Q

Honorary officers
 Zila Bernd, O.Q
 Alain Fuchs, O.Q
 Gérard Collomb, O.Q
 Benoîte Groult, O.Q
 Paul Tréguer, O.Q

Knight of the National Order of Québec

 Henri Brun, C.Q
 Diane Chênevert, C.Q
 Marie Chouinard, C.Q
 Michel Côté, C.Q
 Michel Dallaire, C.Q
 Jean-Pierre Després, C.Q
 André Dubois, C.Q
 Ray-Marc Dumoulin, C.Q
 Marcel Fournier, C.Q
 Guy Gervais, C.Q
 Paul Grand’Maison, C.Q
 Marc Laurendeau, C.Q
 Alain Lemaire, C.Q
 Laurent Lemaire, C.Q
 Marina Orsini, C.Q
 Patrick Pichette, C.Q
 Francine Ruest Jutras, C.Q
 Alain Simard, C.Q
 Kim Thuy, C.Q
 Michel L. Tremblay, C.Q

Honorary Members
 Fernando Cupertino de Barros, C.Q
 Yves Tavernier, C.Q
 Myrna Delson Karan, C.Q
 Jean-Luc Alimondo, C.Q
 Fatimata Dia, C.Q
 Mark Kenber, C.Q
 Noel Lateef, C.Q

Saskatchewan Order of Merit

 Jack Brodsky, S.O.M.
 The Reverend Lorne Calvert, S.O.M.
 Dr. Wilfred (Wilf) Keller, S.O.M.
 The Honourable William (Bill) McKnight, P.C., S.O.M., LL.D.
 Yvette Moore, S.O.M.
 Maestro Victor Sawa, S.O.M.
 Ellen Schmeiser, S.O.M., Q.C.
 Dr. David E. Smith, O.C., S.O.M., F.R.S.C.
 Henry Woolf, S.O.M., LL.D

Order of Ontario

 Peter A. Adamson  Surgical Specialist in Otolaryngology
 Mehran Anvari  Surgical Robotics Pioneer
 Donovan Bailey  Track and Field Icon
 Jennifer Bond  Professor of Law and Human Rights Advocate
 Angèle Brunelle  Advocate for Northwest Ontario's Francophone Community
 Ronald F. Caza  Lawyer and Defender of Francophone Linguistic Rights
 Anthony Kam Chuen Chan  Pediatric Hematologist and Scientist
 Ethel Côté  Entrepreneur, Volunteer and Community leader
 Jim Estill  Entrepreneur and Philanthropist
 Carol Finlay  Anglican Priest and Education Advocate
 Cheryl Forchuk  Scholar in the Fields of Homelessness, Poverty and Mental Health
 Dorothée Gizenga  International Development Expert and Human Rights Advocate
 Shirley Greenberg  Lawyer and Women's Rights Advocate
 Robert Pio Hajjar  Motivational Speaker
 Greta Hodgkinson  Prima Ballerina
 Dorothy Anna Jarvis  Pediatrician
 Lisa LaFlamme  Broadcast Journalist
 M.G. Venkatesh Mannar  Expert in Food Science Technologies and Nutrition
 Ernest Matton (Little Brown Bear)  Community Capacity Builder and Spiritual Ambassador
 Dennis O'Connor  former Associate Chief Justice of Ontario
 David Pearson  Professor and Promoter of Science Communication
 Fran Rider  Women's Hockey Advocate
 Beverley Salmon  Anti-Racism and Community Activist
 Hugh Segal  Public Servant
 Helga Stephenson  Arts Administrator and Human Rights Activist
 Margo Timmins  Vocalist

Order of British Columbia

 Lorne R. Segal (2014)
 Barry Lapointe
 Chief Robert Joseph
 Al B. Etmanski
 Kerry Dennehy
 Tim Collings
 Dr. Ron Burnett
 Don R. Lindsay (2014)
 Jim Shepard
 Sing Lim Yeo
 Dr. Saida Rasul
 Rudolph North (2014)
 Wendy Lisogar-Cocchia
 Ginny Dennehy
 Jane Dyson
 Norman Rolston
 Hari Varshney
 Tamara Taggart
 Melvin Zajac

Alberta Order of Excellence

 David Bissett
 Jack Donald
 Dennis Erker
 Janice Eisenhauer
 Fil Fraser (deceased)
 Stan Grad
 Jacob Masliyah
 Frits Pannekoek

Order of Prince Edward Island

 J.W. (Bill) Campbell
 Gerald Sheldon Dixon
 Dr. Charles St. Clair Trainor

Order of Manitoba

 Rachel Oyenihun Alao
 Chad Allan
 Karen Beaudin
 Tom Cochrane
 Dian Nusgart Cohen
 Wilma L. Derksen
 Daniel George Johnson
 Sheldon Kennedy
 Donald R. J. Mackey
 Mitch Podolak
 Monica Kkhem Kamarie Singh
 Jonathan Toews

Order of New Brunswick

 Camille Normand Albert
 Sister Arleen Brawley
 Gary Peter Gould
 Brent Hawkes, C.M.
 Thaddeus Holownia
 Carol Loughrey
 Sister Adèle Morin
 Dr. Réjean Thomas
 Marlene Unger
 Kevin Michael Vickers, S.C.

Order of Nova Scotia

 Dr. Margaret Macdonald Casey, C.M., O.N.S., M.D., LL.D. (Hon.), DHumL (Hon.)
 Louis E. Deveau, O.C., O.N.S., P.Eng., LL.D. (Hon.)
 Martin Rudy Haase (Deceased), O.N.S.
 Sharon Hope Irwin, O.N.S., Ed.D., LL.D. (Hon.)
 Alistair MacLeod, O.C, O.N.S., Ph.D., FRSC (Posthumous)

Order of Newfoundland and Labrador

 Dr. Noel Browne
 Thomas J. Foran
 William D. Mahoney, OMM, CD
 Melba Rabinowitz
 Philip Riteman, ONS
 Cheryl Stagg
 Kellie Walsh
 The Honourable Clyde K. Wells, QC
 Vincent Withers, CM

Territorial Honours

Order of Nunavut

 Tagak Curley
 Bill Lyall
 Robert Lechat

Order of the Northwest Territories

 Bruce Green
 Lucy Jackson
 Sonny MacDonald
 Gino Pin
 Ruth Spence
 John B. Zoè

Military Valour Decorations

Medal of Military Valour

 Sergeant Sébastien Courville, S.M.V., C.D
 Senior Chief Petty Officer Thomas Ratzlaff, S.M.V. (United States Navy SEAL) ((deceased))
 Captain Umberto Mario Suffoletta, S.M.V., C.D.

Canadian Bravery Decorations

Star of Courage

 William Ayotte

Medal of Bravery

 Master Corporal Garet James Avery
 Kent David Bissell
 Thomas Charles Blair
 Sergeant Jason Cary Bromstad, C.D.
 Robert J. Bronson
 Roderick Bruce Brown
 Craig Mitchell Burns
 Mark Joseph Cameron
 Tyler Andrew Campbell
 John Cerne
 Paul David Charbonneau
 Corporal Christopher James Clark, C.D.
 Neil Wayne David Coles
 Micheal James Collicutte
 Marcel Cormier
 Detective Constable Paul Couvillon
 Paul Dallaire
 Eli Lionel Day
 Chief Petty Officer 2nd class Robert Raymond Deproy, C.D.
 Jean-Pierre Désaulniers
 Michael Douglas Dietrich
 Detective Constable Ed Downey
 Constable Steven Michael Enns
 Constable Carl Ethier
 Master Corporal Robert James Featherstone
 Michel Joseph Fecteau
 Kareem Foster
 Tyler Allan Fowler
 Franklyn Patrick Fraser, S.C.
 Jean-Eudes Fraser
 Romey Francis Gerald Fraser
 Kyle Andrew Griffiths
 Matthew Lewin Grogono
 Mathieu Groleau
 Leading Seaman Neil Charles Joseph Harper
 Dale Hession
 Paul Martin Hurst
 Brette Jessica Jameson
 Constable Mark Jenkins
 Dario Kenk
 Wilbert Kent
 Jeremy Kerr
 Master Warrant Officer Volker Kock, C.D.
 Constable Skeeter B. Kruger
 Rachel Lacroix Pilon
 Denis Lainé
 Constable Trevor A. Lamont
 Gregory Robert Landon
 Janelle Lanoix
 Junior Larochelle
 Steven Larochelle
 Joey Leblanc
 Lonney Joseph Lee
 Dion Christopher Lefebvre
 Detective Constable Keith Lindley
 Lionel Stuart Louison
 René Martel
 William Alexander Marshall
 Brian Francis McCormick
 Hailey Nicole Menard
 Constable Scott M. Moir
 Heiko Mueller
 Mike Joseph Murphy
 Shawn Nagurny
 Francis Vijay Nand
 Jeremy David Olson
 Sigurd Allan Olson
 Sergeant Norman Ewen Penny, S.C., C.D
 Haim Peri
 Paul Jakob Peters
 Josée Pilotte
 Courtney Gail Porter
 Corporal Michael E. Postlethwaite
 Daniel Leroy Privé
 Ernest Jason Quick
 Joseph A. Raczkowski
 John D. Redmond
 Robert Reid
 Constable Luc Roberge
 Sergio Rodriguez Sanchez
 Constable Sean Rogan
 Chief Petty Officer 1st class Michael Salter, C.D.
 Constable Charles Sasso
 Michael Vincent Sharpe
 Adam Andrew Shaw
 Allan Randal Shortt
 Kyle Simpson
 James Christopher Daniel Slatcher
 Harry Brad Smith
 Fred St-Pierre
 Constable Chris Stribopoulos
 David Swisher
 Daniel Roland Thibeault
 François Tremblay
 Jacob Tyler
 John Owen Tyler
 Susannah Grayce Utendale
 Gregory Van Langenhove
 Mason James Van Tassell
 Leading Seaman Benne Naeusteter Wiebe
 Daryl James Williams
 Liane Heather Wood
 Daniel Marvin Wood
 Andrew Zaranek
 Constable Jian Zhang
 Constable Jason Allan Baskin
 Leading Seaman Evan Beaton
 Derron Orlando Brown
 David Burns
 Robert Colmor
 Kennedy Brynne Askew Crossland
 Mandeep Singh Dhaliwal
 Shaun Robert Dimit
 Constable Mark Frendo
 Cody Gidney
 Constable James Robert Guthrie
 Harley David Eelis Hakanen
 Bryan Raymond Henzel
 Anthony Hockenhull
 Keith Jacob Hoffman
 Jaden Michael Hornett-Shaw
 Hamid Jennane
 Joe Kayakyuak Karetak Sr.
 Tyler Anthony Kelley
 Constable Clifford J. Leavitt
 Constable Ryan Arnold Wayne Lewis
 Clifford Eugene Lloyd
 Marc Douglas Lloyd
 Warrant Officer Stanley Dwayne Mercredi, C.D.
 Constable James Alan Moir
 Peter Richard Moody
 Brian Joseph Murphy
 Atos Ottawa
 Gérald Ottawa
 Constable Adam D. Palmer
 Constable Clifford William John Peterson
 Constable Douglas Wade Philip
 Constable Fraser Alan Potts
 Corporal Richard Joseph Bryan Yvan Jean Louis Royer
 Jeremy Slaney
 Constable Patrick J. Smith
 Constable Marie-Andrée Tremblay
 Leading Air Cadet Shannon Diane Young

Meritorious Service Decorations

Meritorious Service Cross (Military Division)

 Lieutenant-Colonel Joseph Michel Steve Boivin, O.M.M., M.S.M., C.D.
 Sergeant Terrence Gregory Grandy, C.D.
 Brigadier-General Charles Adrien Lamarre, O.M.M., C.D.
 Lieutenant-Colonel Walter Andrew Taylor, C.D.

Meritorious Service Cross (Civil Division)

 Clara Hughes, O.C., O.M. M.S.C.
 Her Worship Colette Roy Laroche, M.S.C.
 Sarah Burke, M.S.C.

Second Award of the Meritorious Service Medal (Military Division)

 Chief Warrant Officer Stephen Goward Jeans, M.S.M., C.D.

Meritorious Service Medal (Military Division)
 Major Patrick Lynn Bonneville, M.M.M., C.D.
 Commander Jason Robert Boyd, C.D.
 Major William Michael Church, C.D.
 Lieutenant-General Michael David Dubie (United States Air Force)
 Major Jason Mathew Feyko, C.D.
 Major Joseph Claude Stéphann Grégoire, C.D.
 Master Corporal Mélanie Grenier
 Sergeant Brian Harding
 Brigadier-General Charles Kevin Hyde (United States Air Force)
 Master Corporal Jordan Irvine
 Honorary Lieutenant-Colonel Joseph Luc Lavoie
 Master Warrant Officer Paul Alexander Lucas, C.D.
 Colonel Russell Barry Mann, O.M.M., C.D.
 Major Richard Patrick Mansour, C.D.
 Honorary Colonel John Buckingham Newman, C.D.
 Captain(N) James Douglas O’Reilly, C.D.
 Sergeant Russell Scott Short, C.D.
 Colonel Jeffery Stewart (United States Army)
 Honorary Lieutenant-Colonel Bernard Voyer, O.C., C.Q.

Meritorious Service Medal (Civil Division)

 Thérèse Tanguay Dion, M.S.M.

Polar Medal

 Michel Allard
 Marc-André Bernier
 Marianne Douglas
 John Geiger
 Shelagh Grant
 Ryan Harris
 Louie Kamookak
 Gerald W. Kisoun
 Jonathan Moore
 Anne Morgan
 Doug Stenton
 Second Lieutenant Dorothy Tootoo

Commonwealth and Foreign Orders, Decorations and Medal awarded to Canadians

From Her Majesty The Queen in Right of the United Kingdom

Officer of the Most Excellent Order of the British Empire

 Ms. Elizabeth Anne Carriere
 Mrs. Katharine Davidson

Member of the Most Excellent Order of the British Empire

 Ms. Denka Shenkman
 Mrs. Carolyn Heather MacLeod

Operational Service Medal with Afghanistan Clasp

 Captain Timothy S. Holmes-Mitra
 Sergeant Jonathon Dennis McCallum
 Captain Graham Alexander Morgan

Ebola Medal for Service in West Africa

 Captain Raymond Francis Hartery
 Major Ian Craig Schoonbaert

From the President of the Republic of Austria

Gold Medal for Services to the Republic of Austria
 Mrs. Helga Schmidt

Silver Medal for Services to the Republic of Austria
 Ms. Elisabeth Canisius
 Mr. Harold Scheer

From His Majesty The King of the Belgians

Grand Officer of the Order of the Crown

 The Honourable Louise Arbour
 The Honourable Teresa Wat

Officer of the Order of Leopold II

 Mr. Kevin Russell

From the President of the French Republic

Commander of the National Order of the Legion of Honour

 Mr. Dany Laferrière

Officer of the National Order of the Legion of Honour
 Mr. Jacques Chagnon
 The Honourable Claudette Tardif

Knight of the National Order of the Legion of Honour
 Lieutenant-General Peter J. Devlin
 Mr. Jacques Gauthier
 Dr. Patrick Barnabé
 Mr. Noble Chummar
 Mr. Kenneth McRoberts
 Mr. Lorenzo Donadeo
 Ms. Dany Sauvageau

Officer of the National Order of Merit

 Mr. Michel Picard

Knight of the National Order of Merit
 Major J. A. Marcel Cloutier

Knight of the Order of Arts and Letters

 Mr. Robert Vézina
 Ms. Carolle Brabant
 Mr. Denis Côté
 Mr. Xavier Dolan
 Ms. Pierrette Robitaille

Officer of the Order of the Academic Palms

 Mr. André Côté
 Mr. François de Lagrave
 Mr. Stanislav Jozef Kirschbaum
 Mr. Daniel Coderre
 Mr. Rémi Quirion

Knight of the Order of the Academic Palms
 Ms. Madeleine Bourgeois
 Mr. Serge Courville
 Ms. Lesley Doell
 Mr. Hans-Jürgen Greif
 Ms. Frida Dyshniku Paco
 Mr. Jeff Tennant
 Ms. Jocelyne Faucher

Knight of the Order of Agricultural Merit

National Defence Medal, Gold Echelon

National Defence Medal, Bronze Echelon
 Major Christian Glauninger
 Major Charles M. A. Mangliar
 Captain Pierre-Luc Nicolas

From the President of the Federal Republic of Germany

Cross of the Order of Merit of the Federal Republic of Germany

 Dr. Elisabeth Trudis Goldsmith-Reber

From the President of the Hellenic Republic

Grand Commander of the Order of Honour
 Madam Justice Andromache Karakatsanis

From the President of Republic of Hungary

Officer's Cross of the Order of Merit (civil division) of the Republic of Hungary
  Mr. Levente Laszlo Diosady

Knight's Cross of the Order of Merit of the Republic of Hungary (civil division)
 Mr. Andre Molnar

Gold Cross of Merit (civil division) of the Republic of Hungary
 Mr. Tamas Aladar Mihalik

From the President of the Republic of Italy

Knight of the Order of Merit of the Republic of Italy

 Mr. Guido Pellizzari
 Mr. Nicola Sparano
 Mr. Michael Cuccione
 Mr. Franco Di Girolamo
 Mr. Andrea Marani

Commander of the Order of the Star of the Republic of Italy

 Mr. Luigi Biffis
 Ms. Alberta Cefis
 Mr. Michele Lettieri

From His Majesty The Emperor of Japan

Order of the Rising Sun, Gold and Silver Star

 Mr. Donald Campbell

Order of the Rising Sun, Gold and Silver Rays
 Mr. Martin Blake Kobayashi

From the President of the Republic of Korea

Order of Civil Merit, Seongnyu Medal
 Mr. Vincent Courtenay

Order of Merit of the Republic of Korea
 Lieutenant (Retired) Edward John Mastronardi
 Ms. Myung Hee Kim

From the President of the Republic of Lithuania

Knight's Cross of the Order of the Lithuanian Grand Duke Gediminas
 Ms. Gabija Marija Petrauskas

From His Serene Highness The Prince of Monaco

Officer of the Order of Cultural Merit
 Ms. Marie-Claire Blais

Knight of the Order of Saint Charles
 Mr. Patrick Churchill

From the Secretary General of the North Atlantic Treaty Organisation

NATO Meritorious Service Medal

to Chief Warrant Officer Herbert Alan Sully

From His Majesty The Queen of Norway

Officer of the Royal Norwegian Order of Merit

 Ms. Natalie Denesovych
 Ms. Céline Saucier

From the President of the Republic of Poland

Officer's Cross of the Order of Polonia Restituta

 Mr. Andrzej Rozbicki

Knight's Cross of the Order of Polonia Restituta
 Mr. Wlodzmierz Jaworski

Officer's Cross of the Order of Merit of the Republic of Poland

 to Mr. Jerzy Kulczycki
 Mr. Richard Sokolowski
 Mr. Slawomir Ruciński
 Mr. Wojciech Jerzy Śniegowski
 Mr. Roman Baraniecki

Knight's Cross of the Order of Merit of the Republic of Poland
 Ms. Ewa Zadarnowska
 Ms. Teresa Szlamp-Fryga 
 Ms. Irena Gostomska
 Ms. Anna Maria Jarochowska
 Ms. Grazyna Krupa
 Ms. Anna Nitoslawska
 Ms. Barbara Poplawska
 Ms. Teresa Jadwiga Wierzbicka
 Mr. Jozef Bogucki
 Mr. Stanley Diamond
 Ms. Janina Freyman
 Mr. Bernard Kmita
 Ms. Elizabeth Kozlowski
 Mr. Frank Simpson

Cross of Freedom and Solidarity

 Mr. Roman Chojnaki
 Mr. Jerzy Andrzej Kulczycki
 Mr. Zdzislaw Stachowicz

Cross with Swords of the Order of the Cross of Independence

 Ms. Wanda Jadwiga Kossobudzka

Cross of the Order of the Cross of Independence
to Mr. Stefan Zadrożny

Gold Cross of Merit

 Mr. Pawel Ferensowicz
 Mr. Michal Korwin-Szymanowski
 Mr. Andrzej Ruta
 Mr. Jeffrey Simpson
 Mr. Paul Wells
 Mr. Felix Osinski
 Ms. Ewa Miles-Dixon
 Mr. Tadeusz Biernacki
 Mr. Kazimierz Duchowski
 Ms. Hanna Kamler-Szymańska
 Mr. Jerzy Kuśmider
 Mr. Andrzej Miedzianowski
 Mr. Boguslaw Nizio
 Mr. Jerzy Piros
 Mr. Zenon Przybylak
 Mr. Jerzy Steinmetz
 Ms. Krystyna Świrska
 Mr. Maciej Szymański
 Mr. Grzegorz Tautt
 Mr. Ryszard Wrzaskala
 Mr. Maciej Zaremba
 Mr. Edward Karpinski
 Mr. Andrzej Labedz
 Ms. Barbara Ryniec
 Mr. Marek Wawezyczek

Silver Cross of Merit
 Ms. Irena Borowska-Baker
 Ms. Katherine Rydel
 Mr. Jan Kucy
 Mrs. Urszula Kunikiewicz
 Ms. Teresa Moss
 Mr. Stanislaw Podraza
 Mr. Kazimierz Walewski
 Ms. Grazyna Jędrzejczak
 Ms. Alicja Wojewnik
 Mr. Jerry Kowalski
 Ms. Elzbieta Rulka

Siberian Exiles Cross
 Mr. Kazimierz Sawoszczuk (posthumously)
 Ms. Stefania Stawecka

Long Marital Life Medal

 Mrs. Elzbieta Brusilo
 Mr. Kazimierz Brusilo
 Mr. Kazimierz Prosniak
 Mrs. Stanislawa Prosniak
 Mrs. Helena Kuciak
 Mr. Wojciech Kuciak

From the President of Portugal

Commander of the Order of Prince Henry
 Mr. Carlos Jorge Pinheiro Leitão

Commander of the Order of Infante Dom Henrique
 Mr. Jean-Pierre Andrieux

From the President of the Republic of South Africa

Order of the Companions of O. R. Tambo (Grand Companion — Silver)
 The Right Honourable Martin Brian Mulroney, P.C., C.C., G.O.Q.

From the President of the Russian Federation

Pushkin Medal
 Archpriest Dimitri Sever

From His Majesty The King of Thailand

Commander (Third Class) of the Most Exalted Order of the White Elephant of Thailand

 Mr. Dennis L. Anderson
 Dr. John R. Lacey

Commander (Third Class) of the Most Noble Order of the Crown of Thailand
 Mr. Louis P. Desmarais
 Mr. George Heller

From the President of the United States of America

Commander of the Legion of Merit

 Vice-Admiral Mark Arnold Gordon Norman, C.M.M., C.D.
 General Thomas J. Lawson, C.M.M., C.D.

Officer of the Legion of Merit
 Commodore J. P. Gilles Couturier
 Brigadier-General Wayne D. Eyre
 Lieutenant-General Alain Parent

Bronze Star Medal

 Major Stephen J. Kuervers
 Lieutenant-Colonel J. C. Martin Arcand
 Major-General (Ret'd) James Robert Ferron

Defence Meritorious Service Medal

 Lieutenant-Colonel James Patrick Follwell
 Lieutenant-Colonel Paul G. Young
 Major Charles Côté

Meritorious Service Medal, Second Oak Leaf Cluster
 Lieutenant-Colonel Patrick H. McAdam

Meritorious Service Medal

 Captain Kevin L. Ciesielski
 Lieutenant-Colonel Edward L. Haverstock
 Major Charles M. A. Mangliar
 Warrant Officer Robert B. McKendry
 Major Michael A. Clement
 Lieutenant-Colonel Matthew Philip Haussmann
 Captain Annie Sheink
 Chief Warrant Officer J. J. Raymond Butler
 Captain Neeraj V. Pandey
 Major Michael Lemire
 Warrant Officer Kelly A. Mullagh
 Master Corporal Paul James Clowe
 Major Sean S. Curley
 Master Warrant Officer David C. Daly
 Colonel Brock Millman
 Lieutenant-Colonel Shane W. Gifford
 Warrant Officer Gary Cunningham

Air Medal

 Master Corporal Mark A. Keown

Erratums of Commonwealth and Foreign Orders, Decorations and Medal awarded to Canadians

Correction of 28 February 2015
 From the President of the French Republic, an Officer of the National Order of the Legion of Honour to Lieutenant-General Peter J. Devlin
 From the President of Greece, a Grand Commander of the Order of Honour to The Honourable Andromache Karakatsanis
 From the President of Portugal, a Commander of the Order of Prince Henry to The Honourable Carlos Jorge Pinheiro Leitão

Corrections of 30 May 2015
 From the President of the United States of America, the Bronze Star Medal to Chief Warrant Officer J. J. Raymond Butler

References 

Monarchy in Canada